Naqduz Rural District is in Fandoqlu District of Ahar County, East Azerbaijan province, Iran. The village of Naqduz, with a population of 459, serves as its center. It is one of two rural districts created after the 2016 census within the newly established Fandoqlu District.

References 

Ahar County

Rural Districts of East Azerbaijan Province

Populated places in East Azerbaijan Province

Populated places in Ahar County

fa:دهستان نقدوز